Marcos Gustavo Mondaini (born 14 February 1985 in Sáenz Peña) is an Argentine former professional footballer who played as a striker.

Career

South America
Mondaini began his career in the youth ranks of top Argentine side Boca Juniors, debuting with the first team during the 2004 Apertura season. While with Boca, Mondaini appeared in six league matches.

Mondaini spent the 2006–07 season on loan with Ecuadorian club Emelec. During his one season with Emelec he appeared in 41 matches and scored 12 goals. After the season, he was recognized as the top player in Ecuador's Serie A for 2006. In 2008, he returned to Ecuador to play for Emelec's arch-rival, Barcelona SC. While with Barcelona SC he appeared in 21 matches and scored 3 goals. After returning briefly to Boca, Mondaini was loaned out to Uruguay's Nacional. While with Nacional he helped the club in capturing the 2008–09 league title. He also participated in the 2009 Copa Libertadores for Nacional appearing in seven matches and scoring two goals as the club reached the semi-final stage.

In 2010, he joined Colombia's Atlético Nacional. On 31 July 2010, "The devil", in his debut, scored his first goal for Atlético Nacional in a 3–1 defeat against Deportivo Cali in the third round of the Torneo Finalización of Colombia.

United States
Mondaini was loaned from Centro Atlético Fénix of the Uruguayan Primera División to C.D. Chivas USA of Major League Soccer on 1 March 2011. He scored his first goal for his new club on 30 April in a 3–0 win over New England Revolution.

On 7 May 2011 he made a tackle from behind with no chance of getting the ball on Real Salt Lake's Javier Morales, sending him off the field with a dislocated ankle and two broken bones. Morales was out for several months. Mondaini received a suspension of four games: 3 games for the tackle plus 1 game for the red card.

After one season in MLS, Mondaini signed with his former Ecuadorian club Emelec in January 2012.

Career statistics

Honours

Club
Boca Juniors
Copa Libertadores (1): 2007

Emelec
Serie A Runner-up (2): 2006, 2012
Serie A (2): 2013, 2014

Individual
Emelec
Serie A Assist Leader (2): 2006, 2012
Serie A Best Foreign Player: 2006
Serie A Best Player: 2006

References

External links
MLS player profile
 Argentine Primera statistics
  Estadio.com article, Oct. 5, 2006
 

1985 births
Living people
Argentine footballers
Argentine expatriate footballers
Boca Juniors footballers
Guayaquil City F.C. footballers
C.S. Emelec footballers
Barcelona S.C. footballers
Club Nacional de Football players
Atlético Nacional footballers
Centro Atlético Fénix players
Chivas USA players
Argentine Primera División players
Uruguayan Primera División players
Categoría Primera A players
Ecuadorian Serie A players
Major League Soccer players
Association football wingers
Argentine expatriate sportspeople in Uruguay
Argentine expatriate sportspeople in Colombia
Argentine expatriate sportspeople in Ecuador
Argentine expatriate sportspeople in the United States
Expatriate footballers in Uruguay
Expatriate footballers in Colombia
Expatriate footballers in Ecuador
Expatriate soccer players in the United States
People from Presidencia Roque Sáenz Peña
Sportspeople from Chaco Province